Valentin Román Gasc (born 9 October 2000) is an Argentine professional footballer currently playing as a midfielder for SJK.

Club career
Born in Temperley, Argentina, Gasc joined the reserve team of SJK in March 2021, from Lanús. Following good performances with the reserve team, and making his debut for SJK's first team, he was promoted full-time to the first team ahead of the 2023 season.

International career
Gasc has represented Argentina at under-17 level.

Career statistics

Club

References

2000 births
Living people
People from Temperley
Argentine footballers
Argentina youth international footballers
Association football midfielders
Kakkonen players
Ykkönen players
Veikkausliiga players
Club Atlético Lanús footballers
Seinäjoen Jalkapallokerho players
SJK Akatemia players
Argentine expatriate footballers
Argentine expatriate sportspeople in Finland
Expatriate footballers in Finland